Tokumaru (written:  or  in katakana) is a Japanese surname. Notable people with the surname include:

, Japanese voice actor
, Japanese musician

See also
Tokumaru Station, a railway station in Yazu, Tottori Prefecture, Japan

Japanese-language surnames